Toppin is a surname. Notable people with the surname include: 

Aubrey  Toppin (1881–1969), English officer of arms
Charles Toppin (disambiguation), multiple people
Dexter Toppin (born 1957), South African cricketer
Edgar Toppin (1928–2004), American historian
John Toppin (1900–1965), English cricketer 
Jovon Toppin (born 1989), Trinidadian sprinter
Obi Toppin (born 1998), American basketball player
Rupe Toppin (born 1941), Panamanian baseball player